The meridian 117° east of Greenwich is a line of longitude that extends from the North Pole across the Arctic Ocean, Asia, the Indian Ocean, Australasia, the Southern Ocean, and Antarctica to the South Pole.

The 117th meridian east forms a great circle with the 63rd meridian west.

From Pole to Pole
Starting at the North Pole and heading south to the South Pole, the 117th meridian east passes through:

{| class="wikitable plainrowheaders"
! scope="col" width="130" | Co-ordinates
! scope="col" | Country, territory or sea
! scope="col" | Notes
|-
| style="background:#b0e0e6;" | 
! scope="row" style="background:#b0e0e6;" | Arctic Ocean
| style="background:#b0e0e6;" |
|-
| style="background:#b0e0e6;" | 
! scope="row" style="background:#b0e0e6;" | Laptev Sea
| style="background:#b0e0e6;" |
|-valign="top"
| 
! scope="row" | 
| Sakha Republic Irkutsk Oblast — from  Zabaykalsky Krai — from 
|-valign="top"
| 
! scope="row" | 
| Inner Mongolia
|-
| 
! scope="row" | 
|
|-valign="top"
| 
! scope="row" | 
|-
| style="background:#b0e0e6;" | 
! scope="row" style="background:#b0e0e6;" | South China Sea
| style="background:#b0e0e6;" | Passing through the disputed Spratly Islands
|-
| 
! scope="row" | 
| Balabac Island
|-
| style="background:#b0e0e6;" | 
! scope="row" style="background:#b0e0e6;" | South China Sea
| style="background:#b0e0e6;" | Balabac Strait
|-
| 
! scope="row" | 
| Sabah – Balambangan Island
|-
| style="background:#b0e0e6;" | 
! scope="row" style="background:#b0e0e6;" | South China Sea
| style="background:#b0e0e6;" | Marudu Bay
|-
| 
! scope="row" | 
| Sabah – island of Borneo
|-
| 
! scope="row" | 
| North KalimantanEast KalimantanFuture capital of IndonesiaEast Kalimantan (Balikpapan)
|-
| style="background:#b0e0e6;" | 
! scope="row" style="background:#b0e0e6;" | Makassar Strait
| style="background:#b0e0e6;" |
|-
| style="background:#b0e0e6;" | 
! scope="row" style="background:#b0e0e6;" | Java Sea
| style="background:#b0e0e6;" |
|-
| style="background:#b0e0e6;" | 
! scope="row" style="background:#b0e0e6;" | Bali Sea
| style="background:#b0e0e6;" |
|-
| 
! scope="row" | 
| Island of Sumbawa
|-
| style="background:#b0e0e6;" | 
! scope="row" style="background:#b0e0e6;" | Indian Ocean
| style="background:#b0e0e6;" |
|-
| 
! scope="row" | 
| Western Australia
|-
| style="background:#b0e0e6;" | 
! scope="row" style="background:#b0e0e6;" | Indian Ocean
| style="background:#b0e0e6;" | Australian authorities consider this to be part of the Southern Ocean
|-
| style="background:#b0e0e6;" | 
! scope="row" style="background:#b0e0e6;" | Southern Ocean
| style="background:#b0e0e6;" |
|-
| 
! scope="row" | Antarctica
| Australian Antarctic Territory, claimed by 
|-
|}

See also
116th meridian east
118th meridian east

References

e117 meridian east